The 13th Pan American Games were held in Winnipeg, Manitoba, Canada from July 23 to August 8, 1999.

Medalists

See also
Chile at the Pan American Games
Chile at the 2000 Summer Olympics

External links
COCH - Comité Olimpico de Chile Official site

Nations at the 1999 Pan American Games
Pan American Games
1999